The Battle of Bornholm was a naval engagement that took place in June 1535. The conflict saw Lübeck and the Hanseatic League engaged against the forces of Sweden, Prussia, Holstein, and Denmark. The Battle of Bornholm was part of the larger Count's Feud.

Cause of the battle

In June 1535, Sweden joined with Duke Christian of Gottorp, later crowned King Christian III, in the conflict later known as the Count's Feud 1534-1536 AD.
After the Danish King Frederick I died in 1533, a conflict began between the Danish nobility and their successor, Christian III versus the East Danish Citizenship, led by Copenhagen, Malmö, and Landskrona in alliance with Lübeck.
Duke Christian allied with his brothers-in-law Albert of Prussia and Gustav Vasa, the king of Sweden. When Sweden joined the conflict, Christian III was fighting on two fronts and desperately needed help.

Assembling the fleet

Before sending their fleet to Denmark and Christian III, the Swedish needed an experienced Danish "guide" to assist the Swedish commander, thus Gustav Vasa appointed the Danish noble Peder Skram. He (Gustav Vasa) distrusted Skram and sent an additional letter to the Swedish commander Måns Svensson Some giving him secret orders.
It is important to know that an admiral's task was not to sail the ship, but command it in battle. In Swedish territory, Måns was commander. Later in Danish waters, Peder Skram had the command of the fleet.

The fleet set sail from Stockholm and stopped in Söderköping to bring on board butter. Next, the fleet sold iron in Kalmar and about 1,800 soldiers joined.

Outside the Swedish island Gotland the Swedish fleet met the rest of the allies, from Holstein and Prussia. The Prussian fleet was led by Admiral Johan Pein, who contributed seven warships, of which one ship was large, with a crew of about 900 men.
From Holstein, there are no records of how many ships, only that they were small and few.
(2 small ships?).

Allied ships

Stora Kravelen commanded by Måns Svensson Some and Peder Skram with about 1,000 men
Kamperman unknown commander, Jacob Bagge a later famous admiral in the Russian war (1555-1557) was on board, but not commander.

Lübeck ships

Michael unknown commander

The Sea Battle of Bornholm

June 8, the Lübeck ships are sighted outside Bornholm and the battle begins when the largest
Swedish ships Stora Kravelen and Kamperman engaged the large Lübeck ships.
Stora Kravelen began by attacking Michael but got its "fallmast" destroyed and its maneuverability decreased but Stora Kravelen was supported by Kamperman ,and during the time spent repairing the damage, Michael barely avoided being boarded and fled.

According to contemporary information, the Stora kravelen could quickly follow up the retreating Michael but not board it, thus it was forced to use artillery.
Because of this, the battle of Bornholm is one of the first sea battles fought only with artillery (cannons).
When the smaller Prussian and Holstein ships arrived, the Lübeck ships fled the battle.

Casualties
Stora Kravelen lost 74 men, Michael probably lost 2–3 times more, all other casualties are unknown.

References

Wahlström & Widstrand, "Svenska slagfält" 2005, page 49-54.

Naval battles involving Denmark
Naval battles involving Sweden
Naval battles involving Prussia
Naval battles involving the Hanseatic League
1535 in Europe
Bornholm
Conflicts in 1535